RWB may refer to:

 Red Wanting Blue, an American indie rock group
 Reporters Without Borders
 Resorts World Bhd, subsidiary of Genting Bhd that manages a casino resort in Pahang, Malaysia
 Royal Winnipeg Ballet
 Royal Wootton Bassett, a town in Wiltshire, UK
 RAUH-Welt BEGRIFF, a Japanese tuning-company specializing in modified Porsches and Porsche bodykits